Thalappuzha,  Thavinhal or Thavinjal, is a village in Wayanad district in the state of Kerala, India. It is formally known as aranguthum chall, meaning the place for cultural programs.

Demographics
 India census, Thavinhal had a population of 16766 with 8301 males and 8465 females.

Education
Government Engineering College is the biggest educational organization in this area.

Transportation
Thalappuzha village can be accessed from Mananthavady or Kalpetta. The Periya ghat road connects Mananthavady to Kannur and Thalassery.  The Thamarassery mountain road connects Calicut with Kalpetta. The Kuttiady mountain road connects Vatakara with Kalpetta and Mananthavady. The Palchuram mountain road connects Kannur and Iritty with Mananthavady.  The road from Nilambur to Ooty is also connected to Wayanad through the village of Meppadi.

Agriculture is the mainstay of the economy. Coffee, black pepper and vanilla are the main cash crops.

Image Gallery

See also 
 Boys Town, Mananthavady
 Palchuram
Anjukunnu
Oorpally
Valat

References

Villages in Wayanad district
Mananthavady Area